Chinese Taipei competed at the 2004 Summer Paralympics in Athens, Greece.

Medalists

Sports

Archery

|-
|align=left|Tseng Lung Hui
|align=left|Men's individual W2
|620
|4
|W 155-126
|W 152-150
|L 87-92
|colspan=3|did not advance
|}

Athletics

Men's field

Judo

Men

Powerlifting

Women

Shooting

Men

Women

Table tennis

Men

Women

Wheelchair tennis

Men

Women

See also
Chinese Taipei at the 2004 Summer Olympics

References

Nations at the 2004 Summer Paralympics
2004
Paralympics